Cynometra ulugurensis is a species of plant in the family Fabaceae. It is found only in Tanzania.

Taxonomy

References

ulugurensis
Flora of Tanzania
Endangered plants
Taxonomy articles created by Polbot